Eleonora Menicucci de Oliveira (Lavras, August 21, 1944) is a Brazilian sociologist and was Minister of the Secretariat of Policies for Women until Dilma Rousseff's Impeachment in 2016. She is a full professor in public health at Federal University of São Paulo. A member of the Workers' Party, and dedicated to feminism, she is favorable to the legalization of abortion in Brazil. Menicucci has a degree in Social Sciences from the Universidade Federal de Minas Gerais (1974), MA in Sociology from the Federal University of Paraíba (1983), Ph.D. in political science from the University of São Paulo (1990), post-doctorate in Health and Work of Women from University of Milan (1994/1995) and a teaching degree in Public Health from the School of Public Health, University of São Paulo (1996). She publishes research studies and articles on critical issues related to women in the fields of health, violence and labor. She is divorced and has two children.

Partial works
 (1999) A mulher, a sexualidade e o trabalho

References

1944 births
Living people
People from Lavras
University of São Paulo alumni
University of Milan alumni
Government ministers of Brazil
Workers' Party (Brazil) politicians
Brazilian feminists
Brazilian people of Italian descent
Brazilian sociologists
Abortion-rights activists
Academic staff of the Federal University of São Paulo
Brazilian LGBT politicians